The groma or gruma was a Roman surveying instrument. It comprised a vertical staff with horizontal cross-pieces mounted at right angles on a bracket. Each cross piece had a plumb line hanging vertically at each end. It was used to survey straight lines and right angles, thence squares or rectangles. They were stabilized on the high ground, and pointed in the direction it was going to be used. The helper would step back 100 steps and place a pole. The surveyor would tell him where to move the pole and the helper would set it down.

The same name was given to:
 the center of any new military camp, i.e. the point from which was traced the regular grid by using the groma instrument
 the center of a new town, from which the gromatici (surveyors) began to lay out cardo and decumanus grid, with a plough and a pair of oxen

The groma surveying instrument may have originated in Mesopotamia or Greece before the 4th century BC. Subsequently, it was brought to Rome by the Etruscans and named cranema or ferramentum.

Notes

External links

 BBC: h2g2: The Groma: The Tool That Built An Empire
 University of Arizona – Archaeological Mapping Lab

Surveying instruments
Historical scientific instruments